In X-ray crystallography, crystallographic disorder describes the cocrystallization of more than one rotamer, conformer, or isomer where the center of mass of each form is identical or unresolvable.  As a consequence of disorder, the crystallographic solution is the sum of the various forms.  In many cases, the components of the disorder are equally abundant, and, in other cases, the weighting coefficients for each component differ.  Disorder can entail a pair or several components. Disorder usually arises when the forms are nearly equal in energy and the crystal lattice is sufficiently spacious to accommodate the various components.

References

Crystallography
Materials science
Protein structure
Protein methods
Protein imaging
Synchrotron-related techniques